Tladi is both a surname and a given name. Notable people with the name include:

Dire Tladi (born 1975), South African legal scholar
Moses Tladi (1903–1959), South African painter
Tladi Bokako (born 1993), South African cricketer

See also
Ladi (given name)